Valentina Aleksandrovna Skrabatun (born 23 July 1958 in Dushevo) is a Belarusian rower.

References 
 
 

1958 births
Living people
Belarusian female rowers
Rowers at the 1996 Summer Olympics
Olympic bronze medalists for Belarus
Olympic rowers of Belarus
Olympic medalists in rowing
Medalists at the 1996 Summer Olympics